Sky One had commissioned many homegrown programmes since it first started broadcasting back in 1984 but it was not until 1989 that content went beyond music and children's programming. During the early years, new game shows included a few series of Blockbusters and Spellbound, along with The Price Is Right and Sale of the Century. Original dramas include Dream Team, a series based on a fictional football team; The Strangerers, a science fiction sitcom that was dropped after one series and never repeated; Al Murray's sitcom Time Gentlemen Please; and Baddiel's Syndrome. Hex, another sci-fi show, proved popular but was cancelled in April 2006, and Mile High also proved quite popular but only lasted from 2003 to 2005. Sky One commissioned Terry Pratchett's Hogfather for Christmas 2006, which proved to be their most successful programme ever. Following that success, Sky brought out in 2008 an adaptation of The Colour of Magic and its second half The Light Fantastic, and in 2010 Terry Pratchett's Going Postal, the 33rd book in the Discworld series. Sky also co-produced The 4400 and co-financed the first season of Battlestar Galactica.

The channel shut down for good on 1 September 2021, with its channel number taken by Sky Showcase and much of its content library moved to Sky Max.

This is a list of television programmes broadcast by Sky One in the United Kingdom and Ireland.

Programming at closure

Original programming
The remaining original series listed below were still on the air at the time of Sky One's closure, with future series moved to Sky Max unless stated otherwise.

Drama
 A Discovery of Witches (2018–2021)
 Temple (2019)
 COBRA (2020)

Comedy drama
Agatha Raisin (2016–2020)
Brassic (2019–2020)
Frayed (2019)

Comedy
Breeders (2020–2021)
Code 404 (2020)
Hitmen (2020)

Animation
 Moominvalley (2019–2020)

Unscripted

Game Show
A League of Their Own (2010–2021)

Reality
Rob & Romesh Vs (2019–2021)
Dating No Filter (2021)

Variety
The Russell Howard Hour (2017–2020)

Acquired programming

Adult
 Avenue 5
 The Blacklist
 The Flash
 The Flight Attendant
 Futurama
 Legends of Tomorrow
 Magnum P.I.
 Manifest
 Modern Family
 NCIS: Los Angeles
 Resident Alien
 SEAL Team
 The Simpsons 
 Supergirl
 S.W.A.T.

Kids & family
 All Hail King Julien
 Dawn of the Croods
 DreamWorks Dragons: Rescue Riders
 Madagascar: A Little Wild
 The Mighty Ones
 Trolls: TrollsTopia

Former programming

0–9

The 10th Kingdom
2000 Malibu Road
21 Jump Street
227
3rd Rock from the Sun
24
The 4400

A–G

According to Jim 
 Action Man (DIC series)
The Addams Family
The Adventures of Ozzie and Harriet
Adventures of Superman
The Adventures of Tintin
After Hours
ALF
Alice
Alien Nation
All in the Family
All*Star Cup (transferred to ITV in 2006)
All Star Wrestling
All You Need Is Love
The Amazing Spider-Man
Amen
American Gladiators
American Sex
The American Show
American Sports Cavalcade
America's Dumbest Criminals (now on CBS Reality)
Andromeda (now on Horror Channel)
Angel
Angela and Friends
Animal World
Another World
Are You Smarter than a 10 Year Old? (now on Challenge)
Arrow
The Artistry of Angel Romero
The Arts Channel
Ask Dr. Ruth
At Home with the Hattons
Badger or Bust
Bailey's Bird
Batman
Battlestar Galactica (1978)
Battlestar Galactica (2004)
The Betty White Show
The Beverly Hillbillies
Beverly Hills, 90210
Bewitched
Beyond 2000
The Big Easy
Big Ron Manager
The Big Spell
The Big Valley
The Biggest Loser
Bill Bailey's Birdwatching Bonanza
The Bionic Woman
Black Sheep Squadron
Blackadder: Back and Forth
Blam!!!
Bliss
Blockbusters (1994 and 2000–01 versions)
 Bloomfield
Blue Thunder
The Bob Newhart Show
Boiled Egg and Soldiers
Bonanza (now on CBS Action)
Bones (now on YourTV)
Boney
Born Free
Bounty Hunters
Boston Legal
Barrier Reef
The Brady Bunch
Brave New World (2020 TV series)
Brainiac: History Abuse
Brainiac: Science Abuse
Brainiac's Test Tube Baby
Breaking Away
Bring 'Em Back Alive
Bring the Noise
British Open
British Sex
British Tribes
Batman: The Animated Series
Branded
Brookside (previously shown on Channel 4 and Living)
Buffy the Vampire Slayer (now on E4)
Bulletproof
Bump in the Night
The Business Programme
The Café
Candid Camera
Can't Hurry Love
The Cape
Captain Scarlet and the Mysterons
Car 54, Where Are You
The Carol Burnett Show
Cash and Company
Castaway
Chances
Carnage
Celebrity Showtime
Charlie's Angels
Chicago Hope
China Beach
Chopper Squad
Chris Evans Breakfast Show
Chuck Connors' Great Western Theatre
CI5: The New Professionals
Cimarron City
Cirque de Celebrité
The Cisco Kid
The City
City Lights
Classic Concentration
Cleopatra in Space
The Coca-Cola Eurochart Top 50 Show
Cold Case
Coppers
Count Duckula
Countdown
A Country Practice
Crash Palace
Criminal Minds (now on Sky Witness)
Critical
Cruise with Stelios
CSI: Crime Scene Investigation (now on Sky Atlantic)
CSI: Miami (now on Universal TV)
 Curfew
Custer
Dakar Rally
Daniel Boone
Davis Cup on TV
Dawson's Creek (moved to Sony TV) 
Deadly Ernest Horror Show
Dead Like Me
Deadwood
Delfy and His Friends
Delicious
Dennis the Menace (1959)
Dennis the Menace (1986)
The Deputy
Designing Women
Detective School
Dexter (now on Sky Atlantic)
Diana: Her True Story
Dilbert
Dirty Money
The DJ Kat Show
Doctor Doctor
Don't Forget the Lyrics!
Don't Forget the Lyrics! (US) 
Double Dragon 
The Double Life of Henry Phyfe
Dow Chemical Tennis Classic
Down Under Show
Dragnet
Dragon Booster
Dream Team
The Drew Carey Show
Duck Quacks Don't Echo
Due South
Dynasty (now on CBS Drama)
E Street
Early Edition
Earth: Final Conflict
Earthfile
East of Eden
The Ed Sullivan Show
Ed vs. Spencer
Eight is Enough
Emerald Point N.A.S.
Emergency!
Entertainment This Week
Entertainment Tonight UK
Equal Justice
European Business Channel
The Faith Tour
Falcon Crest (now on CBS Drama)
Falcon Island
Family
Family Affair
Family Guy (now on ITV2)
Family Hours
Family Matters
Family Ties
Fantasy Island
Fashion TV
Fat Families
Father Knows Best
Father of the Pride
Fear Factor (both American and British versions)
The Ferry Aid Gala
First Wave
The Flash (1990)
Flash Gordon
Flying Kiwi
The Flying Nun
Football Icon
Football Years
Forever Knight
Freaks and Geeks
Freddy's Nightmares
Free Spirit
Free Willy
Friday Classic
Friends 
Fringe
From Here to Eternity
Full House
Fun Factory
Gabriel's Fire
Ghoul Lashed
The Game of the Century
Games World
Gamezville
Garfield and Friends
Gemini Man
Get Smart
The Ghost & Mrs. Muir
Ghost Story
Gidget
A Gift to Last
Gilligan's Island
Gladiators (revival UK TV series)
Glee (Seasons 3–6)
Golden Soak
Good Morning Scandinavia
Good Times
Good vs. Evil
Grand Prix Wieler Revue
Grease: The School Musical
Great Moments of Wrestling
The Greatest American Hero
Green Acres
The Green Hornet
Grey's Anatomy (now on Sky Witness)
Growing Pains
Guiding Stars
Gun Law
The Guns of Will Sonnett
Gunsmoke (now on CBS Action and TCM)
Guyana Tragedy: The Story of Jim Jones

H–N

Happy Days
Hawaii Five-0
Hawk
Hairspray: The School Musical
Harry Enfield's Brand Spanking New Show
Hart to Hart
Hazel
Headline News
The Heist
Hex
Hey Dad..!
Higher Ground
Highlander: The Animated Series
Highlander: The Series
Hill Street Blues
Hogan's Heroes
Hollywood Close-Up
Hollywood Sex
Hollywood Wives
Home: Adventures with Tip & Oh
The Honeymooners
Horse Report
Hot Summer Down Under
Hour of Power
House (now on Sky Atlantic)
Howdy Doody
The Human Face of China
Hunter
I Dream of Jeannie
I Love Lucy
An Idiot Abroad
In Living Color
In the Long Run
The Incredible Hulk
 Intergalactic
International Indoor Football
International MotorSports
International Survivor of the Fittest
Is Harry on the Boat?
Ivanhoe
Jake 2.0
Jamestown
The Jeffersons 
Jem 
Jeopardy!  (UK)
Joe 90
Journey to the Unknown
Journeyman
Katie
Keeping Up with the Kardashians (Season 20)
King of the Hill 
Kirsty's Home Videos
Knights and Warriors
Kong: The Animated Series
Kung Fu (now on CBS Action)
Kung Fu: The Legend Continues (now on CBS Action)
Land of the Giants
Las Vegas
Laverne & Shirley
Law & Order 
Learned Friends
Levkas Man
Lie to Me
The Life and Times of Grizzly Adams
Little House on the Prairie
The Live 6 Show
Live from London
Live WINNERS Show
Living the Dream
Liza & Huey's Pet Nation
Lois & Clark: The New Adventures of Superman
Lonesome Dove
Looney Tunes Block/Looney Tunes' Cartoon Classics
Long Play
Lost (Seasons 3–6)
Lost in Space
Love at First Sight
Loveland
The Lucy-Desi Comedy Hour
The Lucy Show
Mad About You
Made in Germany
The Magician
Malcolm in the Middle 
Malo Korrigan
Manimal
Married... with Children
The Mary Tyler Moore Show
M*A*S*H 
Matt Helm
Max Magic
McHale's Navy
Meego
Mega Babies
The Megan Mullally Show
Melrose Place
Men in Trees
Mighty Morphin' Power Rangers (2 October 1993 – 13 October 1996) 
The Mighty Ones
Mile High
Mister Ed
The Moaning of Life
Models Inc.
The Monkees
Moone Boy
Moonlight
Moonlighting
Mork & Mindy
Morning Glory
Motorsport News
Movie Classic
Movietime
Movin' On
Mr. Personality
Mummies Alive!
The Munsters
The Muppets
Muppets Tonight
Murphy Brown
Music Box
Must Be the Music
My Favorite Martian
My Kitchen Rules
My Little Pony 
My Little Pony Tales  
My Pet Monster
My Three Sons
NYPD Blue
The Nanny
Nanny and the Professor
The Nature of Things
NCAA on TV
The New Candid Camera
The New Dick Van Dyke Show
Newhart
NFL American Football
NHL Ice Hockey
Night Man
Ninja Warrior (now on Challenge)
Nip/Tuck (Seasons 1–3)
NSWRL Premiership on TV

O–U

Oliver Beene
Once and Again
One West Waikiki
Oops TV
Orson and Olivia
The Outer Limits (1963)
The Outer Limits (1995)
The Outsiders
Pacific Blue
Pacific Palisades
Paradise Beach
Parents
Parker Lewis Can't Lose
The Partridge Family
Passions
Pathfinders
The Paul Hogan Show
Petticoat Junction
PGA Tour
Phantom 2040
The Phoenix Team
Phyllis
The PJs
Pokémon 
Police Stop!
Police Story
Police Woman
Poltergeist: The Legacy
Pop Formule
The Pop Years
Popples 
Popular
Porno Valley 
Port Charles
The Pretender
The Price Is Right 
Prison Break
Private Practice
Project Catwalk
Quantum Leap
The Quest
The Race Against Time
Raising Hope
Red Shoe Diaries
Reds in Europe
Relic Hunter
The Reluctant Landlord
Renegade
Rescue 911
Rescue Heroes
Rescue Me
Revolution (U.S. TV series)
Revolution
Rhoda
Riptide
Ritter's Cove
Robin of Sherwood
RoboCop: The Series
Robot Wars (now on Challenge)
Roger Ramjet
Roots
The Ropers
Roswell Conspiracies
Roswell High
Roughnecks: Starship Troopers Chronicles
The Round Table
Roving Report
Rush
Ryan's Hope
Sale of the Century
Sanford and Son
Sara
Saturday Movie Matinée
Saturday Night Main Event
Scrubs 
The Secret Video Show
Seinfeld 
Seven Little Australians
Sha Na Na
Shadow Raiders
The Sharon Osbourne Show
Shasta McNasty
Shock Treatment
Shōgun
Sick Note
Sick of It
Sightings
Silk Stalkings
Skellig
Skippy the Bush Kangaroo
Ski Report
Skiboy
Sky By Day
Sky One Undun
Sky Star Search
Sky Trax
Sky-Fi
Skyways
Slammy Award
Small Wonder
Snow Report
Soft N Romantic
Soldier Soldier
Something Is Out There
Son of the Beach
The Sonny & Cher Comedy Hour
South Park (now on Comedy Central)
Space: Above and Beyond
Space Island One
Space Precinct
Space Shopping
Spartacus
Speed
Spellbound
Sport Aid
Spring Movie Festival
Springhill
Spy
St. Elsewhere
Stan Lee's Lucky Man
Standby...Lights! Camera! Action!
Standoff
Star Fleet
Star Trek: Deep Space Nine 
Star Trek: Enterprise
Star Trek: The Next Generation 
Star Trek: The Original Series 
Star Trek: Voyager 
Stargate Atlantis  
Stargate Infinity
Stargate SG-1
Stargate Universe
Starlings 
Starsky & Hutch
Stingray (and the other TV series by the same title)
Strike Back
The Strangerers
Studs
Suddenly Susan
The Sullivans
Summer Uncovered
SummerSlam
The Sun Military Awards
Sunday Movie
Sunday Movie Matinée
Sunday Night Movie
Sunset Beach
Superboy
Superhuman Samurai Syber Squad
Superstars of Wrestling
Survivor Series
Stop Search Seize
Super Bowl
Swiss Family Robinson
Tabitha
Tales from the Crypt
Tales of Wells Fargo
Tandarra
Tarzan: The Epic Adventures
Taste
Tattooed Teenage Alien Fighters from Beverly Hills
Teech
Teenage Mutant Hero Turtles
Terra Nova
Terry Pratchett's The Colour of Magic
Terry Pratchett's Going Postal
Terry Pratchett's Hogfather
There's Something About Miriam
Thorne
Three's Company
Threshold
Thrill Seekers
Thrillmaker Sports
Through the Keyhole 
Thunderbirds
Time Gentlemen Please
The Time Tunnel
Titus
Tom Jones
The Tommy Hunter Show
Top End Down Under
Total Recall 2070
Touch
Tour de Suisse
The Transformers 
Transformers: Armada
Trans World Sport
Trollied
Tru Calling
TV Years
The Tyra Banks Show
Unsolved Mysteries
The Untouchables (1959)
The Untouchables (1993)
U.S.F.L. Football

V–Z

V
V: The Final Battle
Været i Europa
Vegas
VFL Australian Rules Football
The Villa
Voyagers!
VR.5
Vroom Vroom
Wagon Train
Walker, Texas Ranger (now on CBS Action)
Wall of Fame 
The Wanderer
Wayne and Shuster
The Wayans Bros.
We Can Rebuild You
Weather Report
Wednesday Classics
Weeds
Werewolf
The West Wing
What about Mimi?
What's Happening!!
What's Happening Now!!
Where's Wally?
Wild Things
Woman's Day
Wonderfalls
The Word
World Cup Report
World Games
The World Global Video Awards
The World Tomorrow
WrestleMania
WWE After Burn (now on Sky Sports Action)
WWE Bottom Line (now on Sky Sports Action)
WWE Experience (now on Sky Sports Action)
WWE Heat
WWE SmackDown! (now on Sky Sports Action)
WWE Tough Enough
WWF Action Zone
WWF All-American Wrestling
WWF Championship Wrestling
WWF Jakked/Metal
WWF LiveWire
WWF Mania
WWF Shotgun Saturday Night 
WWF Superstars (of Wrestling)
WWF Wrestling Challenge
The X-Files (now on Paramount Network)
Xena: Warrior Princess
The Young Doctors
Young Ramsay
You, Me and the Apocalypse
You've Come a Long Way, Katie
Yu-Gi-Oh! 
Yu-Gi-Oh! 5D's (only aired the first 14 episodes, moved to CITV)
Zoids
The Zeta Project

Notes

References

Sky One programmes
Sky One